Fluoroethyl is an organofluorine functional group in chemistry.

See also
 Trifluoromethyl

References 

Haloalkyl groups